eEF-1 are two eukaryotic elongation factors. It forms two complexes, the EF-Tu homolog EF-1A and the EF-Ts homolog EF-1B, the former's guanide exchange factor. Both are also found in archaea.

Structure 
The nomenclature for the eEF-1 subunits have somewhat shifted around circa 2001, as it was recognized that the EF-1A and EF-1B complexes are to some extent independent of each other. Components as currently recognized and named include:

The precise manner eEF1B subunit attaches onto eEF1A varies by organ and species. eEF1A also binds actin.

Other species 

Various species of green algae, red algae, chromalveolates, and fungi lack the EF-1α gene but instead possess a related gene called EFL (elongation factor-like). Although its function has not been studied in depth, it appears to be similar to EF-1α.

, only two organisms are known to have both EF-1α and EFL: the fungus Basidiobolus and the diatom Thalassiosira. The evolutionary history of EFL is unclear. It may have arisen one or more times followed by loss of EFL or EF-1α. The presence in three diverse eukaryotic groups (fungi, chromalveolates, and archaeplastida) is supposed to be the result of two or more horizontal gene transfer events, according to a 2009 review. A 2013 report finds 11 more species with both genes, and provided an alternative hypothesis that an ancestor eukaryote may have both genes. In all known organisms where both genes are present, EF-1α tends to be transcriptionally repressed. If the hypothesis holds true, scientists would expect to find an organism that has a repressed EFL and a fully-functioning EF-1α.

A 2014 review of EF-1α/EFL possessing eukaryotes considers both explanations insufficient on their own to explain the complex distribution of these two proteins in Eukaryotes.

In eukaryotes, a related GTPase called eRF3 participates in translation termination. The archaeal EF-1α, on the other hand, performs all functions carried by these subfunctionalized variants.

See also 
Eukaryotic translation

References

External links 
 

Protein biosynthesis
Eukaryote genes